CKQR-FM is a Canadian radio station that broadcasts a classic rock format at 99.3 FM in Castlegar, British Columbia. The station is branded as The Goat and it is owned by the Vista Broadcast Group.

History
The station originally signed on September 22, 1969 and began broadcasting at 1230 AM in the 1970s, then moved to 760 AM in 1984  until it moved to its current frequency in 1998.

CKGF began broadcasting on 1340 kHz in 1969 and moved to FM in the 1980s.

In 1993, CKQR began simulcasting some of its programming on CKGF Grand Forks. On December 16, later that same year, CKQR was given approval to add an FM transmitter at Nelson, operating on 103.5 MHz, with an effective radiated power of 84 watts. The rebroadcaster in Nelson signed on the following year.

On February 3, 2005, the CRTC approved the application by Valley Broadcasters Ltd. for a broadcasting licence to operate an English-language FM commercial radio programming undertaking in Nelson. The new station would operate at 103.5 MHz (channel 278A1) with an average effective radiated power of 104 watts, and would have a transmitter in Crawford Bay operating at 91.9 MHz (channel 220LP) with an ERP of 40 watts. The new station in Nelson would replace CHNV-FM, a transmitter of CKQR, also owned by Valley.

At midnight on June 11, 2010, CHNV in Nelson ceased being a rebroadcaster of CKQR and moved to its own programming. It was still branded as Mountain FM and continues to have its current active rock format.

On June 19, 2014, Mountain FM was rebranded as The GOAT.

At 1:00 pm on March 10, 2016, CKGF Grand Forks ceased being a rebroadcaster of CKQR- and moved to its own programming. It was branded as Juice FM and operates under a variety hits format. 93.3 FM in Christina Lake, 96.7 FM in Greenwood, and 103.7 FM in Rock Creek also flipped to rebroadcast CKGF.

Rebroadcasters

See also
CKGF-FM

References

External links
The GOAT
 
 
 

Castlegar, British Columbia
Kqr
Kqr
Kqr
Radio stations established in 1969
1969 establishments in British Columbia